Reconnaissance by fire (recon by fire), also known as speculative fire, is a warfare tactic used in which military forces may fire on likely enemy positions to provoke a reaction, which confirms the presence and the position of enemy forces.

World War II
Reconnaissance by fire was widely adopted by the Allies against the Axis in the European theater of World War II. Previously armored units would typically advance in column behind light armored scouting units. At the same time infantry would be present to provide support in the event of ambush by German panzerfaust teams. This method proved too slow to keep pressure on retiring enemy forces. Instead, US armored columns continued to advance at speed, training cannon and machine guns alternately to fire to cover both the left and the right of the axis of advance. The column would fire its weapons more or less continuously into any suspected enemy positions as they appeared, suppressing and distracting the aim of enemy gunners and antitank teams. Supply echelon convoys using trucks equipped with .50-cal. M2 Browning machine guns also used the tactic when traveling through areas not completely cleared of enemy forces.

Vietnam War
During the Battle of Ia Drang of the Vietnam War, a US Army battalion commander, Lieutenant Colonel Hal Moore, noticed that his men had a large amount of ammunition. He ordered his men to fire at anything suspicious at an agreed synchronised time. The large amount of fire at that time led a group of undetected infiltrating enemy soldiers to believe that they had been discovered and to charge the Americans, leading to their destruction.

References

Assault tactics